Paul Lundeen is a Colorado politician and a member of the Colorado State Senate, representing District 9. Previously he served in the Colorado House of Representatives as the representative from the 19th District, which encompassed portions of El Paso County, including the communities of Black Forest, Calhan, Ellicott, Gleneagle, Monument, Peyton, Ramah, and Woodmoor.
 
Lundeen is a Republican and lives in Monument, Colorado.

Career 
A businessman, Lundeen previously served on the Colorado State Board of Education, representing the Fifth District, and for a time he served as the Board's chair.

A bill proposal by Lundeen aimed at requiring voters to cast ballots in person, limiting early voting, and only allowing voters to cast ballots by mail if they opt for it despite voting by mail having been used in Colorado for years. In February 2021, a Senate panel rejected the bill.

In March 2021, Lundeen attended a panel that promoted the false claim that the 2020 presidential election was fraudulent. During a speech, Lundeen cast doubt on the validity of the election results including that of Colorado's.

Elections
 Lundeen was first elected to the State House in 2014. He ran unopposed in both the Republican primary and the general election. 
 In 2016, Lundeen was re-elected. In the general election, he won 79.59% of the vote against his Democratic opponent.
In June, 2017, Lundeen announced that in the 2018 elections he would seek the District 9 State Senate seat currently held by Kent Lambert, who is term limited. Lambert immediately endorsed Lundeen.
Running for reelection in 2022, Lundeen won the Republican primary held on June 28, and in the 2022 Colorado Senate general election, Lundeen defeated his Democratic Party and Libertarian Party opponents, winning 62.31% of the total votes cast.

References

External links
 Campaign website
 State House website

21st-century American politicians
Living people
New York University alumni
People from Monument, Colorado
Republican Party Colorado state senators
Republican Party members of the Colorado House of Representatives
School board members in Colorado
Year of birth missing (living people)